Sid Boyling (May 9, 1914 – November 5, 2006) was a Canadian broadcaster.

Boyling worked at radio station CHAB shortly after graduating. From October 1969 to 1979 Boyling was the General Manager of Winnipeg Videon. He helped the cable system start the community access station, VPW in 1972.

References

External links
 broadcasting-history.ca - Sid Boyling
 Winnipeg Free Press - John Sidney Boyling Obituary

1914 births
2006 deaths
Canadian media executives